Aleksandr Valentinovich Sidorichev (born 8 February 1985) is a Russian former professional football player.

Club career
He played in the Russian Football National League for FC Rotor Volgograd in 2017.

External links
 
 

1985 births
Sportspeople from Volgograd
Living people
Russian footballers
Association football defenders
FC Chernomorets Novorossiysk players
FC Rotor Volgograd players
FC Dynamo Stavropol players
FC Khimik Dzerzhinsk players